The Class BB 67300 is a group of diesel locomotives used by SNCF. They were built by Brissonneau and Lotz between 1967 and 1969.

A development of the BB 67000 class of diesel engines fitted with electric train heating and three-phase transmission. Designed as a mixed traffic loco, twenty were fitted for push-pull operation.

Names
One member of the class was named: BB 67348 La Bernerie-en-Retz.

See also
 TCDD DE 24 000
 Alstom AD24C

References

67300
67300
B-B locomotives
BB 67300
Railway locomotives introduced in 1967
Standard gauge locomotives of France